The following lists the events of the 1904 Philadelphia Phillies season.

Spring Training 
The Phillies conducted their spring training in 1904 in Savannah, Georgia where the team practiced and played exhibition games at Bolton Street Park. It was the first season the Phillies trained in Savannah.

1904 Philadelphia City Series

The Phillies played eight games against the Philadelphia Athletics for the local championship in the pre-season city series. The Athletics defeated the Phillies, 5 games to 3.

The series was to have opened on April 2, 1904 at the Phillies’ Philadelphia Ball Park but was called off due to wet grounds. The game scheduled for April 9, 1904 at the Phillies’ park was canceled due to rain.

The Phillies and Athletics had each won 10 of the 20 games between the two teams after the 1904 series,

Regular season

Season standings

Record vs. opponents

Roster

Player stats

Batting

Starters by position 
Note: Pos = Position; G = Games played; AB = At bats; H = Hits; Avg. = Batting average; HR = Home runs; RBI = Runs batted in

Other batters 
Note: G = Games played; AB = At bats; H = Hits; Avg. = Batting average; HR = Home runs; RBI = Runs batted in

Pitching

Starting pitchers 
Note: G = Games pitched; IP = Innings pitched; W = Wins; L = Losses; ERA = Earned run average; SO = Strikeouts

Other pitchers 
Note: G = Games pitched; IP = Innings pitched; W = Wins; L = Losses; ERA = Earned run average; SO = Strikeouts

References 

1904 Philadelphia Phillies season at Baseball Reference

Philadelphia Phillies seasons
Philadelphia Phillies season
Philly